Bessinger Nunatak is a mound-shaped nunatak,  high, standing at the southwest end of Mackin Table,  east of Mount Tolchin, in the southern Patuxent Range, Pensacola Mountains. It was mapped by the United States Geological Survey from surveys and from U.S. Navy air photos, 1956–66, and named by the Advisory Committee on Antarctic Names for Lieutenant C.D. Bessinger, Jr. (MC) U.S. Navy, officer in charge of South Pole Station, winter 1963.

References 

Nunataks of Queen Elizabeth Land